Search for Grace is a 1994 American mystery drama television film directed by Sam Pillsbury and written by Alex Ayres. Set in Buffalo and Niagara Falls, New York, the film follows a woman named Ivy (played by Lisa Hartman Black) as she leaves her dependable boyfriend Dave (Don Michael Paul) for the mysterious Johnny (Ken Wahl). Ivy begins experiencing flashbacks to the life of a long-dead woman named Grace (also played by Hartman), whose life in 1927 parallels Ivy's. It aired on CBS on May 17, 1994.

Cast
 Lisa Hartman Black as Ivy / Grace
 Ken Wahl as John "Johnny" Danielli / Jake
 Richard Masur as Dr. Randolph
 Suzzanne Douglas as Margaret / Melody
 Don Michael Paul as Dave / Sam
 Lori Lindberg as Dr. Sanders
 Evan Wood as Young Sarah / Robin

Production
Search for Grace was filmed in Wilmington, North Carolina.

Critical reception
Ray Loynd gave the film a generally positive review in the Los Angeles Times, writing that it "advances the cause of imagination." Varietys Tony Scott panned the film, concluding that "[t]here's not much suspense or mystery in the obvious tale."

Ratings
Search for Grace averaged a 10.5 national Nielsen rating, where each ratings point represents 942,000 households, with a 17 percent audience share. It was the 36th highest-rated prime time program for the week of May 16 to 22, 1994.

References

External links
 

1994 television films
1994 drama films
1990s English-language films
1990s mystery drama films
American drama television films
American mystery drama films
CBS network films
Films directed by Sam Pillsbury
Films scored by Michael Hoenig
Films set in 1927
Films set in the 1990s
Films set in Buffalo, New York
Films shot in North Carolina
Niagara Falls in fiction
1990s American films